Madhavi Sardesai (7 July 1962 – 22 December 2015) was an Indian academic and the editor of the Konkani literary journal "Jaag". She was also a scholar, publisher and writer who worked mainly in the Konkani language in Goa. She headed the Goa University's Konkani Department. She died on 22 December 2014 after a battle with cancer.

Early life and education
Sardesai did her primary education through the Konkani medium, and graduated from Chowgule College, Margao in English and Philosophy. She had a Master of Arts degree (M.A). in linguistics, and presented work on 'Some Aspects of Konkani Grammar' for her MPhil degree. Her PhD was from Goa University's Department of English for her thesis on 'A Comparative Linguistic and Cultural Study of Lexical Influences on Konkani'.

Career
She has worked on the topic of the Portuguese influence on Konkani language and the "linguistic genius" of Shenoi Goembab.

She published research papers on the Konkani language, literature and linguistics and also wrote poems, essays, and short-stories. She served as the Executive Editor of the Jaag monthly and was its editor since August 2007.

Death
Madhavi Sardesai died on 22 December 2014.

Books
 Bhasa-Bhas a book on linguistics.
 Eka Vicharachi Jivit Katha (Eternal Story of a Thought)
 Mankullo Raj Kunvor, a translation of the children's novelette, The Little Prince, from French into Konkani
 Manthan (collection of essays)

Awards
Sardesai won the award of Sahitya Akademi, Delhi for creative writing in Konkani (2014) for her book, Manthan. Earlier, She was awarded the 1998 Sahitya Akademi Translation Prize for her translation, Eka Vicharachi Jivit Katha.

References

External links

 Mother tongue blues
 Dr. Madhavi Sardessai speaks at valedictory function of national seminar on Konkani novel
 Prakash Parienkar on Madhavi Sardessai's book-Manthan
 Audio-recording of Manthan release, Konkani

1962 births
2014 deaths
Konkani-language writers
20th-century Indian linguists
Indian women linguists
People from Margao
People from Lisbon
Scholars from Goa
20th-century Indian women writers
20th-century Indian writers
20th-century Indian women scientists
Women writers from Goa
Educators from Goa
Women educators from Goa
21st-century Indian women writers
21st-century Indian writers
21st-century Indian linguists
Recipients of the Sahitya Akademi Award in Konkani
Recipients of the Sahitya Akademi Prize for Translation